The 2005–06 All-Ireland Intermediate Club Hurling Championship was the second staging of the All-Ireland Intermediate Club Hurling Championship since its establishment by the Gaelic Athletic Association in 2004.

The All-Ireland final was played on 12 February 2006 at Croke Park in Dublin, between Dicksboro from Kilkenny and Ballinhassig from Cork, in what was their first ever meeting in the final. Dicksboro won the match by 2-13 to 1-13 to claim their first All-Ireland title.

Leinster Intermediate Club Hurling Championship

Leinster final

Munster Intermediate Club Hurling Championship

Munster quarter-final

Munster semi-finals

Munster final

All-Ireland Intermediate Club Hurling Championship

All-Ireland semi-finals

All-Ireland final

References

All-Ireland Intermediate Club Hurling Championship
All-Ireland Intermediate Club Hurling Championship
All-Ireland Intermediate Club Hurling Championship